Thomas James Mison (born 23 July 1982) is an English film, television, and theatre actor, voice artist, and writer. He has had leading and supporting roles in a variety of British theatre, television, and radio productions, as well as independent and mainstream studio films and film shorts. He is best known for his starring role as Ichabod Crane on the Fox series Sleepy Hollow, which ran from September 2013 to March 2017. He played Fainall in the Donmar Warehouse's 2018 production of William Congreve's The Way of the World and also worked in Watchmen portraying the clones of Mr. Phillips and the Game Warden.

Early life
Born on 23 July 1982, Mison was raised in Woking, Surrey, part of the London commuter belt. He attended Hurtwood House, a sixth form college which specialises in drama and music. He trained at the Webber-Douglas Academy, where he was awarded the Sir John Gielgud Trust Award, from 2001 to 2004. His speech coach at Webber-Douglas advised him to aim for period pieces. A close friend at Webber-Douglas was Rupert Friend, an actor and writer with whom Mison collaborated to create the short film The Continuing and Lamentable Saga of the Suicide Brothers in 2009.

In 2001, while still a drama student, Mison participated in the American Conservatory Theater's Young Conservatory program. Mison had a role in Time on Fire, a play about the American Revolution by Timothy Mason, which the Young Conservatory performed at London's National Theatre and San Francisco's Magic Theater. Mison played a British soldier hidden and protected by his love interest, played by Caitlin Talbot.

Career

Theatre
From 2004 to 2012, Mison found steady work in the theatre, appearing as Fortinbras in a Trevor Nunn-directed production of Hamlet at the Old Vic Theatre in 2004; playing Frederick in the simple8 theatre company's adaptation of Les Enfants du Paradis at the Arcola Theatre in 2006 and acting in another simple8 theatre production, The Living Unknown Soldier in 2008; and starring as George Tesman in Hedda at the Gate Theatre in 2008 and as Gabriel in Andrew Bovell's When the Rain Stops Falling at the Almeida Theatre in 2009. The Evening Standard called his turn in Les Enfants du Paradis "memorable" and said "[t]his is an actor we'll be hearing of again." The Guardian called his performance "glowing."

In 2010, he was cast in British playwright Laura Wade's Posh which ran at the Royal Court Theatre. Mison played James Leighton-Masters, the president of a fictional Oxford dining club called the Riot Club. The Daily Telegraph's Charles Spencer gave it four stars and called Mison "particularly memorable."

In 2012, the play was revived in the West End at the Duke of York's Theatre. Mison next played Prince Hal in Henry IV, Part 1 and Henry IV, Part 2 at the Theatre Royal, Bath in 2011.

In February 2018, the Donmar Warehouse in London announced the cast for the theatre's 2018 production of The Way of the World, a Restoration comedy by William Congreve. Mison was cast to play the character of Fainall.

Mison has also written several UK stage monologues including Wood, Bounded, and The Life Man of Portland Mews.

Film
From 2005 to 2008, Mison appeared in a number of movies, mainly in small roles. These early film appearances include roles in the Hallmark Channel movie Mysterious Island; the BBC TV movie A Waste of Shame: The Mystery of Shakespeare and His Sonnets; and the Peter O'Toole vehicle Venus.

In 2009, Mison and fellow Webber-Douglas Academy graduate Rupert Friend, Mison's roommate at the time, wrote and acted in a film short, The Continuing and Lamentable Saga of the Suicide Brothers. The Brownlee Brothers directed the film, which Mison described as a "Brothers Grimm style fairy tale." The short film is a dark comic fairy tale about two brothers, played by Mison and Friend, who attempt to kill themselves at the same time every day; Keira Knightley plays a fairy. Fashion designers Poltock & Walsh screened the film at an event, leading to media reports that the film was made to promote the designers' fashion line. Mison has said these reports are inaccurate. The short film screened at a number of festivals, including the 2009 BFI London Film Festival; the 2009 New Hampshire Film Festival, where it won Best Short Comedy; the 2010 Cleveland International Film Festival; the 2010 London Short Film Festival; and the 2010 Rhode Island International Horror Film Festival, where it tied for first place for Best Short. In 2012, Mison starred in Friend's directorial debut, Steve, a short film that also starred Knightley and Colin Firth.

In 2011, Mison played Callum in the film adaptation of David Nicholls' novel One Day. One Day starred Anne Hathaway and Jim Sturgess; Lone Scherfig directed. His most notable film role to date came in 2012 in the romantic comedy Salmon Fishing in the Yemen. Lasse Halstrom directed this film adaptation of Paul Torday's novel, and Ewan McGregor and Emily Blunt starred. Mison played Capt. Robert Mayers, the military boyfriend of Emily Blunt's character Harriet. The movie was generally well-received critically and did well at the box office. In the US, it reached the box office top ten, peaking at No. 7. The review aggregator website Rotten Tomatoes reports a 67% positive rating among critics, based on 139 reviews.

Mison appeared in two independent British films released in 2013. In Jadoo, written and directed by Amit Gupta, Mison plays Mark, the fiance of the daughter of the two feuding brothers at the heart of the story. Jadoo's world premiere was at the 2013 Berlin film festival, the Berlinale, in a special section on "Culinary Cinema." It was released in the UK in September 2013 and played at over 20 festivals.

Mison also had a supporting role in Dead Cat, a romantic comedy written by Sam Bern and Stefan Georgiou; Georgiou also directed. Mison plays Tim, part of a group of four friends, one of whom has just reconnected with his childhood sweetheart. The four actors playing the friends are friends in real life, and the roles were written for them. Although Dead Cat was filmed in 2009, it was not released until 2013. It was featured in a number of festivals in 2013, including the Cambridge Film Festival in the UK; the Indie Spirit Film Festival in Colorado; the British Independent Film Festival, where it won the British Lion Award for Achievement in Film on a Low Budget; and the Southampton International Film Festival, where it won Best Film of the Festival and Best Feature Film. Mison won Best Performance by an Actor in a Supporting Performance. Dead Cat also won Best of Show at Indie Fest in July 2013.

Television
Mison appeared in several British television productions from 2006 to 2012. He played Ben Sixsmith in The Amazing Mrs. Pritchard, a six-episode series on BBC One. It was broadcast on Masterpiece Theatre on PBS in 2007. He played Daniel in the premiere episode of Secret Diary of a Call Girl, broadcast on ITV2 in 2007. It premiered in the US on Showtime in 2008.

In 2008 he played Mr. Bingley in Lost in Austen, a fanciful adaptation of Pride and Prejudice. The four-part mini-series, written by Guy Andrews and broadcast on ITV, imagines a modern-day woman who is transported to the world of Pride and Prejudice, her favourite novel. The series was generally well received by critics.

From 2008 to 2010, Mison had roles in three successful British TV series. In 2008, he appeared in season 11 of Agatha Christie's Poirot, the 70-episode television adaptation of Agatha Christie's stories and novels featuring the detective Hercule Poirot. Mison played David Baker, a character described as a "peacock", in "Third Girl." The following year, Mison appeared in Lewis, the ITV-produced detective drama (broadcast as Inspector Lewis on PBS). Mison played Dorian Crane, a young professor and popular fantasy novel writer, in "Allegory of Love", an episode in series 3 broadcast in 2009. In 2010, Mison played Tim Mortimer in "It Smells of Books", an episode of the BBC One series New Tricks.

Mison's next television role was in Parade's End, the pedigreed television adaptation of the Ford Madox Ford novel tetralogy Parade's End. Written by Tom Stoppard and starring Benedict Cumberbatch, the five-part series aired on BBC Two in 2012 and HBO in 2013. Mison played Potty Perowne, erstwhile lover of Sylvia Tietjens, wife of Christopher Tietjens, played by Cumberbatch. The series received good reviews and was nominated for five Emmy awards and five BAFTA awards in 2013.

In early 2013, Mison was cast to play the co-lead in a new Fox television series, Sleepy Hollow alongside co-star, Nicole Beharie. Mison plays Ichabod Crane, a Revolutionary War soldier killed in battle who re-awakens in 21st century Sleepy Hollow. The show is broadly inspired by Washington Irving's "The Legend of Sleepy Hollow". The show's co-creators and executive producers are Philip Iscove; Alex Kurtzman and Roberto Orci, co-creators of the Fox TV show Fringe and the writers of the current Star Trek film reboot; and the pilot episode was directed by Len Wiseman, director of Live Free or Die Hard and director of the first two/co-producer of all four Underworld films. Mison co-stars with Nicole Beharie, who plays police lieutenant Abbie Mills. Orci and Kurtzman have said that they originally intended to cast an American actor but were unable to find an actor who could credibly play a Revolutionary era man in the 21st century. The show was a hit for Fox in its first season, to the surprise of some in the media. Mison received very strong reviews from critics and the media for his portrayal of Crane. In September 2013, the Television Critics Association named Mison most likely to achieve breakout status for the 2013 season. Entertainment Weekly's Darren Franich called him a "constant revelation". Maureen Ryan in The Huffington Post said "[Mison] plays Crane's confusion, urgency, anger and bemusement note perfectly." 
The show was renewed for a second season after two weeks on the air. In March 2015, Sleepy Hollow was picked up for a third season for 18 episodes. On 13 May 2016 Fox renewed the show for a fourth season which premiered on 6 January 2017. In May 2017, Fox declined to renew the show for a fifth season.

In 2018, he was cast in a supporting role in Watchmen where he portrayed the clones of Mr. Phillips and the Game Warden.

In 2021, Mison was cast as a series regular in the Apple TV+ series See.

Personal life
Mison has a son with his wife Charlotte Coy.

Filmography

Film

Television

Stage

Radio

References

External links

Tom Mison Fansite

Alumni of the Webber Douglas Academy of Dramatic Art
1982 births
People from Woking
English male television actors
English male film actors
English male radio actors
English male voice actors
English screenwriters
English male screenwriters
Living people
English male stage actors
People educated at Hurtwood House
21st-century English male actors
Male actors from Surrey